"Pop That Booty" is the third US and second UK single from Marques Houston's debut album, MH. The video and single features a guest appearance from Jermaine Dupri. It is the third track on MH album.

The single was another hit for Houston in both the UK and US. In the UK, "Pop That Booty" peaked inside the UK top thirty at number twenty-three and reached number seventy-six on the Billboard Hot 100.

A music video was produced featuring B2K member Lil Fizz and Jermaine Dupri.

Track listing
UK - CD
 "Pop That Booty" (featuring Jermaine Dupri) (radio edit)
 "Pop That Booty" (instrumental)

UK - Vinyl
 "Pop That Booty" (featuring Jermaine Dupri) (radio edit)
 "Pop That Booty" (featuring Jermaine Dupri) (a cappella)
 "Pop That Booty" (instrumental)

References

2003 singles
Marques Houston songs
Songs written by Marques Houston
The Ultimate Group singles
2003 songs
Songs written by Tricky Stewart
Songs written by Jermaine Dupri